The Last Sun Son (German: Der letzte Sonnensohn) is a 1919 German silent film directed by Erik Lund.

Cast
In alphabetical order
 Olga Engl as Fürstin  
 Bernhard Goetzke as Herzog  
 Ria Jende 
 Bruno Kastner as Horos  
 Max Laurence as Herzog  
 Karl Platen as Prinz von Noowara 
 Leopold von Ledebur as Minister

References

Bibliography
 Hans-Michael Bock and Tim Bergfelder. The Concise Cinegraph: An Encyclopedia of German Cinema. Berghahn Books.

External links

1919 films
Films of the Weimar Republic
German silent feature films
Films directed by Erik Lund
German black-and-white films
1910s German films